111P/Helin–Roman–Crockett is a periodic comet in the Solar System. It was discovered by Eleanor and Ron Helin on 5 January 1989 from images obtained on the 3rd and 4th of that month. It is a Jupiter family comet known for extremely close approaches to Jupiter being a Quasi-Hilda comet. During these approaches, it actually orbits Jupiter. The last such approach was in 1976, the next will be in 2071. The Jovian orbits are highly elliptical and subject to intense Solar perturbation at apojove which eventually pulls the comet out of Jovian orbit for the cycle to begin anew.

Simulations predict such a cycle is unstable, the object will either be captured into an encounter orbit (e.g. Shoemaker-Levy 9) or expelled into a new orbit which does not have periodic approaches. This implies that 111P's orbit is recent within the past few thousand years. It fits the definition of an Encke-type comet with (TJupiter > 3; a < aJupiter).

References

External links
 Orbital simulation from JPL (Java) / Horizons Ephemeris
 111P/Helin-Roman-Crockett – Seiichi Yoshida @ aerith.net
 Elements and Ephemeris for 111P/Helin-Roman-Crockett – Minor Planet Center
 111P at Kronk's Cometography
 
 Observations, www.oaa.gr.jp

Periodic comets
Encke-type comets
0111
111P
111P
Comets in 2013
19890105